Basrahia, also spelled Basrheya, is a village in Gosainganj block of Lucknow district, Uttar Pradesh, India. As of 2011, its population is 1,596, in 301 households.

References 

Villages in Lucknow district